Regina Cleri is a home for retired priests in the Archdiocese of Boston. It is located in Boston's West End. It was established in December 1964 by Richard Cardinal Cushing to provide health care and support for senior priests of the Archdiocese. 

, 56 priests lived there and through its history to that point almost 400 had lived there. A group of Sister Disciples of the Divine Master work at the home. The executive director of the facility is Stephen J. Gust.

A 50th anniversary celebration was attended by Seán Patrick Cardinal O'Malley and Mayor Marty Walsh. Though the priests are officially retired, many continue to assist in parishes throughout the archdiocese.

References

Residential buildings in Boston
Roman Catholic Archdiocese of Boston
West End, Boston